Tarkington is an English surname, a variant of the place name Torkington; other variants include Talkington and Turkington.

John Tarkington, Sr., his wife Prudence, their son John, Jr. and wife Martha, and their son William Joshua came to America in about 1668. The plantation was named "The Grove".

John Tarkington was one of the original settlers of Maryland. He began to accumulate property by getting settlers to move to a certain locality. In 1675 he transported a group into the province to inhabit Cecil County and obtained  for himself.

John Tarkington had a son Samuel, who it is said was killed or kidnapped by the natives.

Booth Tarkington's ancestors migrated through Tyrrell County, North Carolina and then on to Indiana.

Notable people with the surname include:
 Booth Tarkington (1869–1946), an American novelist and dramatist
 Rockne Tarkington (1931–2015), an American actor

References

Sources

External links
Tarkington Genealogy - A site dedicated to family history of the Tarkington and Tarkenton surnames.

Surnames